John Thomas Ewing, Litt.D., L.H.D., (1856 – October 31, 1926) was an American educator, university administrator, and college football coach. He taught as a professor of Classics and served as the registrar at Alma College for 36 years. Ewing was the head coach of the Alma football team in 1894.

Biography
Ewing graduated from the University of Michigan with a Bachelor of Arts degree in 1880. From 1882 to 1887, he served as the Superintendent of Schools at Petoskey, Michigan. In 1887, he was hired to the faculty at the College of Wooster, where he served as the Principal of the Preparatory Department until 1890. Ewing received a Master of Arts degree from Wooster in 1890, where he studied Latin comedy. While at Wooster, Ewing worked with Cornelius Marshal Lowe on the "widely known" text Caesar's Gallic War, which was first published in 1891. In 1890, the chairman of Greek studies at Alma College resigned to take a job elsewhere, and Alma hired Ewing onto its faculty as a professor of ancient languages. Ewing remained at Alma College as a professor and the registrar for 36 years.

In 1894, Ewing was the head football coach at Alma College in Alma, Michigan. His coaching record at Alma was 2–0.

Ewing died on October 31, 1926 after a brief illness.

Head coaching record

Published works
Caesar's Gallic War, 1891.

References

1856 births
1926 deaths
American classical scholars
Alma Scots football coaches
Alma College faculty
University of Michigan alumni
College of Wooster alumni
College of Wooster faculty
People from Petoskey, Michigan
People from Alma, Michigan